Adéṣínà is a surname of Yoruba origin which literally translates to: "the crown or royalty opens the way (forward)". The name is often given to a long-awaited child (following barrenness). Notable people with this surname include:

 Akinwumi Adesina (born 1960), President of the African Development Bank
 Dapo Lam Adesina (born 1978), Nigerian politician, member of Nigeria's 8th House of Representatives
 Femi Adesina, Nigerian journalist and government official, the special adviser on media and publicity to President Muhammadu Buhari
 Lam Adesina (1939–2012), Nigerian educator, governor of Oyo State
 Samuel Adesina Gbadebo (1908–1971), Nigerian traditional monarch
 Samuel Adesina (1958/9–2014), Nigerian politician and Speaker of the Ondo State House of Assembly
 Sikiru Adesina (1971–2016), Nigerian film actor, director and producer

See also
 Adeshina

References 

Yoruba-language surnames